Gołuski  is a village in the administrative district of Gmina Dopiewo, within Poznań County, Greater Poland Voivodeship, in west-central Poland.

According to the Institute of International Relations the village has a population of 528.

References

Villages in Poznań County